Bed and Breakfast is a 1930 British comedy film directed by Walter Forde and starring Jane Baxter, Richard Cooper and Sari Maritza. It was based on a play by Frederick Whitney.

Thought to have been lost, the film was found as a result of a 1992 British Film Institute campaign to locate missing films.

Cast
 Jane Baxter as Audrey Corteline 
 Richard Cooper as Toby Entwhistle 
 Sari Maritza as Anne Entwhistle 
 Alf Goddard as Alf Dunning 
 David Hawthorne as Bernard Corteline 
 Cyril McLaglen as Bill 
 Ruth Maitland  as Mimosa Dunning 
 Muriel Aked as Mrs. Boase 
 Frederick Volpe as Canon Boase 
 Mike Johnson as Henry 
 Matthew Boulton as Police Sergeant

References

External links

1930 films
1930 comedy films
British comedy films
1930s English-language films
Films directed by Walter Forde
1930s rediscovered films
British black-and-white films
Rediscovered British films
1930s British films